Compagnie de Saint-Gobain S.A. is a French multinational corporation, founded in 1665 in Paris and headquartered on the outskirts of Paris, at La Défense and in Courbevoie. Originally a mirror manufacturer, it now also produces a variety of construction, high-performance, and other materials.

History

1665–1789: Manufacture royale 
Since the middle of the 17th century, luxury products such as silk textiles, lace and mirrors were in high demand. In the 1660s, mirrors had become very popular among the upper classes of society: Italian cabinets, châteaux and ornate side tables and pier-tables were decorated with this expensive and luxurious product. At the time, however, the French were not known for mirror technology; instead, the Republic of Venice was known as the world leader in glass manufacturing, controlling a technical and commercial monopoly of the glass and mirror business. French minister of finance Jean-Baptiste Colbert wanted France to become completely self-sufficient in meeting domestic demand for luxury products, thereby strengthening the national economy.

Colbert established by letters patent the public enterprise Manufacture royale de glaces de miroirs (Royal Mirror-Glass Factory) in October 1665. The company was created for a period of twenty years and would be financed in part by the State. The beneficiary and first director was the French financier Nicolas du Noyer, receiver of taxes of Orléans, who was granted a monopoly of making glass and mirror-glass for a period of twenty years. The company had the informal name Compagnie du Noyer.

To compete with the Italian mirror industry, Colbert commissioned several Venetian glassworkers he had enticed to Paris to work for the company. The first unblemished mirrors were produced in 1666. Soon the mirrors created in the Faubourg Saint-Antoine, under the French company, began to rival those of Venice. Competition between France and the Venetians became so fierce that Venice considered it a crime for any glass artisan to leave and practice their trade elsewhere, especially in foreign territory. Nicolas du Noyer complained in writing that the jealous Venetians were unwilling to impart the secrets of glassmaking to the French workers and that the company was hard-pressed to pay its expenses. Life in Paris proved distracting to the workers, and supplies of firewood to stoke the furnaces were dearer in the capital than elsewhere. In 1667, the glass-making was transferred to a small glass furnace already working at Tourlaville, near Cherbourg in Normandy, and the premises in Faubourg Saint-Antoine were devoted to glass-grinding and polishing the crude product.

Though the Compagnie du Noyer was reduced at times to importing Venetian glass and finishing it in France, by September 1672 the royal French manufacturer was on a sufficiently sound footing for the importation of glass to be forbidden to any of Louis' subjects, under any conditions. In 1678, the company produced the glass for the Hall of Mirrors at the Palace of Versailles.

In 1683, the company's financial arrangement with the State was renewed for another two decades. However, in 1688 the rival Compagnie Thévart was created, also financed in part by the state.

The two companies were in competition for seven years, until 1695, when the economy slowed down and their technical and commercial rivalry became counterproductive. Under an order from the French government, the two companies were forced to merge, creating the Compagnie Plastier. A mirror factory in the village of Saint-Gobain in Picardie gave its name to the present company.

In 1702, Compagnie Plastier declared bankruptcy. A group of Franco-Swiss Protestant bankers rescued the collapsing company, changing the name to Compagnie Dagincourt. At the same time, the company was provided royal patents which allowed it to maintain a legal monopoly in the glass-manufacturing industry up until the French Revolution (1789), despite fierce, sometimes violent, protests from free enterprise partisans.

1789–1910: Industrial Revolution 
In 1789, as a consequence of the French Revolution, the state financial and competitive privileges accorded to Compagnie Dagincourt were abolished. The company now had to depend on the participation and capital of private investors, although it continued to remain partly under the control of the French state.

In the 1820s, Saint-Gobain continued to function as it had under the Ancien Régime, manufacturing high-quality mirrors and glass for the luxury market. However, in 1824, a new glass manufacturer was established in Commentry, France, and in 1837, several Belgian glass manufacturers were also founded. While Saint-Gobain continued to dominate the luxury high-quality mirror and glass markets, its newly created competitors focused their attention on making medium and low-quality products. The manufacture of products of such quality made mirrors and glass affordable for the masses. In response, the company extended its product line to include lower-quality glass and mirrors.

In 1830, just as Louis-Philippe became King of the newly restored French Monarchy, Saint-Gobain was transformed into a Public Limited Company and became independent from the state for the first time.

While mirrors remained their primary business, Saint-Gobain began to diversify their product line to include glass panes for skylights, roofs and room dividers, thick mirrors, semi-thick glass for windows, laminated mirrors and glass and finally embossed mirrors and windowpanes. Some of the more famous buildings that Saint-Gobain contributed to during that period were the Crystal Palace in London, Jardin des Plantes, the  Grand Palais and adjacent Petit Palais in Paris, and Milan Central railway station.

Saint-Gobain merged with another French glass and mirror manufacturer, Saint-Quirin, in the mid-19th century. After the merger, the company was able to gain control of 25% of European glass and mirror production (before, it had only controlled 10–15%). In response to growing international competition, the company began to open up new manufacturing facilities in countries without any domestic manufacturers.

Saint-Gobain cast the glass blanks of some of the largest optical reflecting telescopes of the early 20th century, including the ground-breaking  Hale telescope (online in 1908), the 61-inch (1.54 m) Bosque Alegre telescope built in 1912, for the Argentine National Observatory, directed by Charles D. Perrine, and 100 inch (2.5 m) Hooker telescope (online 1917) at Mount Wilson Observatory (United States), and the  Plaskett telescope (online in 1918) at Dominion Astrophysical Observatory (Canada).

1910–1950: Post Industrial Revolution 
Saint-Gobain experienced significant success in the early 20th century. In 1918, the company expanded its manufacturing to bottles, jars, tableware and domestic glassware.

In 1920, Saint-Gobain extended its businesses to fibreglass manufacture. Fibreglass was being used to create insulation, industrial textiles and building reinforcements. In 1937, the company founded Isover, a subsidiary fibreglass insulation manufacturer.

During this period, the company developed three new glassmaking techniques and processes; first, a dipping technique used to coat car windows, which prevented the glass from shattering in the event of an accident. As a result of that technique, 10% of Saint-Gobain's 1920 sales came from the car industry, and 28% in 1930. Second, a few years later, another technique was developed that allowed glass to be shaped and bent. Finally, a process was developed to coat glass with aluminium, allowing it to be used as a conductor, and allowed the company to create products such as the ‘radiavers’ (French for “radiating glass”), a unique type of electric heater with the heating element encased in glass.

1950–1970: Pont-à-Mousson merger
Between 1950 and 1969, Saint-Gobain's sales rose at a rate of 10% per year. Its workforce grew from 35,000 in 1950 to 100,000 in 1969. By the end of the 1960s, Saint-Gobain had more than 150 subsidiaries under its control.

Glass and fibreglass sales benefited from the booming construction industry and the rise in mass consumption after the Second World War. In 1950, fibreglass only represented 4% of the company's turnover, but by 1969, this had grown to 20%.

Domestic sales in France accounted for only a fifth of the company's revenue. Spain, Germany, Italy, Switzerland and Belgium were also important markets.

In 1968, Boussois-Souchon-Neuvesel, a French industrial group, made a hostile takeover bid for Saint-Gobain. The company looked for a "white knight" to help fend off the bid. Multinational corporation Suez suggested that Saint-Gobain and Pont-à-Mousson (another French industrial group) should merge, in order to maintain independence from Boussois-Souchon-Neuvesel. After the merger, Saint-Gobain-Pont-à-Mousson, later known simply by the name "Saint-Gobain", produced pipes in addition to glass and fibreglass.

1971–1986: Nationalisation
The next fifteen years were a time of change and reorganization for the newly merged companies. In the 1970s, Western economies were suffering a sharp downturn. Saint-Gobain's financial performance was adversely affected by the economic and petrol crisis.

In 1981, and 1982, ten of France's top-performing companies were nationalized by the socialist Fifth Republic of France. By February 1982, Saint-Gobain was officially controlled by the state. However, the company did not last long as a government-owned corporation; it was re-privatized in 1987.

1986–present: Expansion
When Saint-Gobain once again became a private enterprise, control of the company quickly changed hands. Jean-Louis Beffa, an engineer and graduate of the École Polytechnique, became the CEO. Beffa invested heavily in research and development and pushed strongly for the company to produce engineered materials, such as abrasives and ceramics.

Under Beffa, the company continued to expand internationally, setting up foreign factories, and acquiring many of its foreign competitors. In 1996 the company bought Poliet (the French building and construction distribution group) and its subsidiaries, such as Point P. and Lapeyre. This expanded Saint-Gobain's product line into construction materials and their distribution. In 2005, Olivier Bluche took the helm of Supply Chain Operations, quickly modernising the company's lengthy and dated processes. In October 2022, Saint-Gobain Films & Fabrics was renamed Saint-Gobain Composite Solutions.

Company structure

Head office 
The company has its head office in Les Miroirs in La Défense and in Courbevoie. The  building served as the company head office since 1981.

Committees

Executive committee
As of August 2019, the executive committee of Saint-Gobain is composed of:
 Pierre-André de Chalendar, Chairman – Chief Executive Officer
 Benoit Bazin, Chief Operating Officer
 Laurent Guillot, Senior Vice-President, CEO High Performance Solutions.
 Patrick Dupin, Senior Vice-President, CEO Northern Europe Region
 Guillaume Texier, Senior Vice-President, CEO Southern Europe, Middle East and Africa Region
 Thomas Kinisky, Senior Vice-President, Innovation and Chairman North America
 Javier Gimeno, Senior Vice-President, CEO Asia-Pacific Region
 Mike Newnham, CEO Saint-Gobain Building Distribution UK & Ireland and Managing Director of Jewson
 Claire Pedini, Senior Vice-President, Human Resources and Digital Transformation.
 Sreedhar N., Chief Financial Officer
 Armand Ajdari, Vice-President, Research and Development
 Antoine Vignial, Corporate Secretary in charge of Corporate Social Responsibility
 Julie Bonamy, Vice-President Strategy
 Benoit d’Irirbarne, Vice-President Technology and Industrial Performance
 Laurence Pernot, Vice-President Communications

Business Sectors

Saint-Gobain is organized into three major Sectors (% by 2014 Net Sales restated excluding Verallia): Building Distribution (49%), Construction Products (27.5%), Innovative Materials (23.5%).

Building distribution

Saint-Gobain's Building Distribution (building supplies) division was created in 1996. Since then it has grown both internally and through acquisitions (in France with Point P. and Lapeyre, the UK with Jewson and Graham, in Germany, the Netherlands and Eastern Europe with Raab Karcher and in the Nordic Countries with Dahl). The division has 4,000 stores in 24 countries and employs 63,000 people worldwide. Its 2006 sales amounted to 17.6 billion euros. The divisions current subsidiaries are:
 SGBD UK
 Raab Karcher
 Point P.
 Lapeyre
 Brødrene (Brothers) Dahl
 Norandex Distribution
 Optimera, with the 'Monter' DIY chain

Construction products
The Construction Products division is organized into the following business areas:

- Gypsum, which manufactures drywall
- Insulation, which manufactures acoustic and thermal fibreglass and PIR insulation
- Exterior Products, which manufactures roofing, interior and exterior products
- Pipes, which manufactures cast-iron pipes for water transfer applications
- Mortars, which manufactures expanded clay lightweight aggregates.

The Construction Products division employs 45,000 people worldwide and in 2006 had sales revenues of 10.9 billion euros.

Companies:
CertainTeed
Gyproc
Weber
Celotex, based at Hadleigh, Suffolk

Innovative materials

The Innovative Materials division conducts research into various areas of materials science, energy, the environment, and medicine, such as fuel cells or particle filters. It operates centres in Cavaillon, Northborough, Massachusetts and Shanghai, employing 35,800 people. Overall, the division's sales are made up of at least 30% new products. In 2006, total sales revenue was 4.9 billion euros. Innovative Materials also manufactures glass products, including self-cleaning, electrochromic, low-emissivity and sun-shielding glass. It is active in 39 countries, targeting emerging economies, a market that now accounts for more than one-third of the division's sales. It employs a global workforce of 37,100 and in 2006 had sales revenues of 5.1 billion euros.
This division is divided in two parts:

- Flat Glass subsidiaries : Saint-Gobain Glass, Glassolutions and Saint-Gobain Sekurit

- High Performance Materials : Saint-Gobain SEFPRO Saint-Gobain Abrasives, Saint-Gobain Crystals, Saint-Gobain Norton, Saint-Gobain Quartz and Saint-Gobain Norpro

In 2006, Saint Gobain announced a JV, Avancis, with Shell to produce PV modules based on CIS film technology. After the company had entirely owned Avancis and its two plants in Germany manufacturing thin CIS film modules for some time, it was sold to China National Building Materials Group Corporation (CNBM) in 2014.

External venturing
Saint-Gobain also has a division that focuses on connecting entrepreneurs, startups, and innovators to the 50+ bin Saint-Gobain called: NOVA External Venturing. The External Venturing unit has staff in Boston, Paris, and Shanghai interested in connecting with entrepreneurs working in advanced materials, construction products, and environmental sustainability.

Acquisitions and sales
Saint-Gobain has made a number of recent acquisitions in the past several years. In December 2005, it purchased the British company BPB plc, the world's largest manufacturer of plasterboard, for US$6.7 billion. In August 2007, the company acquired Maxit Group, doubling the size of its Industrial Mortars business and adding the manufacture of expanded clay aggregates to its business portfolio. In 2012, the company acquired SAGE Electrochromics, an innovative manufacturer of glass that tints on command. In 2018 Saint Gobain acquired UK-based Farécla Products, one of the largest polishing compound manufacturers in the world.

The company has also sold off various assets. Recently the company sold its cosmetic glass manufacturing business, including a plant in Newton County, Georgia, United States.

Saint-Gobain Gyproc Middle-East
Saint-Gobain Gyproc Middle East began trading as Gyproc in 2005. In April 2010, the company's first plasterboard manufacturing plant opened on a seven-hectare site in Abu Dhabi.

Gyproc products have been used on some of the largest projects in the region, including the stations and main depot for Dubai Metro; Atlantis Hotel – Palm Jumeirah, Capital Gate – Abu Dhabi, Ferrari Experience – Abu Dhabi and Masdar Institute – Abu Dhabi.

Saint-Gobain in India
Saint-Gobain India Private Limited – Glass Business (formerly Saint-Gobain Glass India Limited) is a subsidiary of Saint Gobain that manufactures and markets solar control glass, fire-resistant glass and other various types of float glasses in India. It has its manufacturing plant at Sriperumbudur,  from Chennai.

Saint-Gobain started its venture in India in 1996 by acquiring a majority stake of Grindwell Norton. Later in 2000, it started its own glass manufacturing unit at Sriperumbudur. In June 2011, Saint Gobain Glass India acquired Sezal Glass float-line business, based in the state of Gujarat, India. The acquisition adds about 550 tons per day additional capacity, and the deal was inked at around US$150 million. In addition, Saint-Gobain Glass invested in Bhiwadi, Rajasthan in 2014, which adds another 950 tons of glass per day. And recently in 2018, Saint-Gobain again invested in Sriperumbudur with 950-ton capacity, which results in the production of 3850 tons of glass per day from India.

Brands 
Saint-Gobain comprises several brands, including Saint-Gobain Glass, Saint-Gobain Performance Plastics, GCP Applied Technologies, Weber, British Gypsum, Decoustics, Glassolutions, Gyproc, Artex, Isover, CTD, Jewson, Ecophon,  Pasquill and PAM.

Environmental impact 
Saint-Gobain had contaminated ground water supply with PFAS (perfluorooctanoic acid – a highly persistent contaminant) in multiple towns in Southern New Hampshire, USA. Elevated levels of perfluorooctanoic acid were found in 2016, near the Saint-Gobain plant in Merrimack. Pollution has been occurring for over 20 years. Saint-Gobain deliberately and intentionally constructed a bypass stack to thwart environmental inspections and avoid PFAS removal. Despite this flagrant violation of their permit they were allowed to continue to operate. Former state representative and environmental scientist Mindi Messmer has linked exposure to Saint-Gobain’s PFAS emissions with kidney and renal pelvis cancer, testicular cancer, female breast cancer, prostate cancer, ulcerative colitis, thyroid disease, high cholesterol, cardiovascular impacts.
As of 2022, Saint Gobain is involved in multimillion-dollar class-action lawsuits. Its former company lawyer was terminated after he repeatedly urged "the company to do more to address contamination from their plants in Merrimack; Bennington, Vermont; and Hoosick Falls, N.Y".

See also 

 Saint-Louis (glass manufacturer)
 Albert Merlin
 List of oldest companies

References

Sources 
 Compagnie de Saint-Gobain – History
 Reuters article – Heidelberg Cement, Maxit Group Acquisition

Further reading
 
 
List of fines, monetary settlements and costs such as supplementary environmental projects or consumer relief that Saint-Gobain has been compelled to undertake as part of settlements.

External links 
 

 
1665 establishments in France
Companies established in 1665
Companies based in Île-de-France
Multinational companies headquartered in France
French brands
Glassmaking companies of France
Building materials companies of France
History of glass
Price fixing convictions
CAC 40
Companies listed on Euronext Paris
Privatized companies of France